Ilija Krstevski (born 21 February 1993) is a Macedonian handball player who plays for PIF.

References

1993 births
Living people
Macedonian male handball players
Sportspeople from Skopje